Seton Ingersoll Miller (May 3, 1902 – March 29, 1974) was an American screenwriter and producer. During his career, he worked with film directors such as Howard Hawks and Michael Curtiz. Miller received two Oscar nominations and won once for Best Screenplay for fantasy romantic comedy film Here Comes Mr. Jordan (1941) along with Sidney Buchman.

Career

Fox Films
A Yale graduate, Miller began writing stories for silent films in the late 1920s. He signed a contract at Fox Film Corporation where his credits included Paid to Love (1927), Two Girls Wanted (1927), High School Hero (1927) and Wolf Fangs (1927).

A Girl in Every Port and Howard Hawks
Miller's first big hit was A Girl in Every Port (1928) directed by Howard Hawks, a crucial film in Hawks' career.

He was reunited with Hawks for Fazil (1928) then did two Rex Bell Westerns, The Cowboy Kid (1928) and Girl-Shy Cowboy (1928).

Miller wrote Hawks' first sound film, The Air Circus (1929) then did The Far Call (1929) for Allan Dwan and The Lone Star Ranger (1930). He did a comedy, Harmony at Home (1930) then left Fox.

Miller joined Hawks at First National and did The Dawn Patrol (1930). After working on Today (1930) he did three for Hawks: The Criminal Code (1931) at Columbia, Scarface (1932), and The Crowd Roars (1932).

He did The Last Mile (1932) then adapted the comedy play Once in a Lifetime (1932).

Paramount
At Paramount, Miller wrote Hot Saturday (1932) and a horror film, Murders in the Zoo (1933).

He did The Eagle and the Hawk (1933) for Hawks then Gambling Ship (1933). He went to Columbia for Master of Men (1933).

At Paramount he did Come On Marines! (1934) for Henry Hathaway then went back to Fox for Murder in Trinidad (1934), Marie Galante (1934) and Charlie Chan's Courage (1934).

He worked on The Farrell Case for James Cagney and Jack Holt but it was not made.

Warner Bros
For Warner Bros., Miller wrote The St. Louis Kid (1934) for James Cagney. After working on Murder on a Honeymoon (1935) for RKO, Warners asked him to return to work on further Cagney films: G Men (1935), and Frisco Kid (1935). He wrote a sequel to G Men, G Women that was not made.

Miller wrote It Happened in New York (1935) for Universal and Two in the Dark (1936) for RKO. At Republic he wrote The Leathernecks Have Landed (1936).

Miller went back to Warner Bros to do Bullets or Ballots (1937) for Edward G. Robinson and Humphrey Bogart. He stayed at the studio to work on Marked Woman (1937), San Quentin (1937), Back in Circulation (1937), and Kid Galahad (1937). He wrote Kit Carson for Wayne Morris but it as not made.

He worked on the Errol Flynn vehicle, The Adventures of Robin Hood (1938), which was a big success. He was put on another Flynn film, a remake of The Dawn Patrol (1938).

Miller wrote Valley of the Giants (1938), and two with John Garfield, Dust Be My Destiny (1939) and Castle on the Hudson (1939). He did another Flynn swashbuckler, The Sea Hawk (1940). He wrote a Western for Flynn, Tombstone but it was not made.

He left Warners in July 1939 after four years.

Post-Warners
At Universal he adapted I James Lewis but it does not appear to have been made.

At Columbia he cowrote Here Comes Mr. Jordan (1941) which won him an Oscar. At Universal he wrote This Woman is Mine (1942). Warners' Secret Enemies (1942) was based on his story.

20th Century Fox
Miller went to Fox, where he worked on My Gal Sal (1942) and The Black Swan (1942).

At Columbia he adapted the play Heart of City for Merle Oberon but it was not made.

Paramount: Turning Producer
Miller signed a contract with Paramount to write and produce. He started with Ministry of Fear (1944), directed by Fritz Lang. He was assigned The Griswold Story but it was not made.

He had written a script of Two Years Before the Mast for Edward Small in 1939. The project was bought by Paramount, and Miller also produced. It was directed by John Farrow and he and Miller made two more films together, California (1947), and Calcutta (1947).

Miller also produced The Bride Wore Boots (1946).

Warners & Universal
Miller sold his script for Singapore (1947) to Universal in 1947. It was later remade as Istanbul (1957).

In August 1947, he signed with Warner Bros to write and produce. He was to start with Colt 45 starring Wayne Morris. It was not made. Instead he wrote and produced Fighter Squadron (1948) and wrote The Man Who Cheated Himself (1950) originally known as The Gun.

He associate produced The Sound of Fury (1950). In 1950 he formed a company with Irvin Rubin.

He wrote and produced Queen for a Day (1951) at United Artists. He wrote an adaptation of Island in the Sky but is not credited on the final film.

Miller wrote The Mississippi Gambler (1953) and Bengal Brigade (1954) for Universal. He did The Shanghai Story (1954) for Republic.

In 1955, he sold a Western script, The Staked Plains to Henry Fonda. He wrote scripts for a Dennis O'Keefe TV series Hart of Honolulu.

In 1957, he wrote The Willie Gordon Story for Ray Milland to be shot in England but it was not made.

That year he sold a story Pete's Dragon for the Disney company to make as a vehicle for Kevin Corcoran. The eventual film was not made for another two decades.

Miller was credited on the remake of The Last Mile (1959).

He wrote Death Valley Days and created a series Rogue for Hire.

Later career
His later credits include Knife for the Ladies (1974).

An unpublished story of his was filmed as Pete's Dragon (1977).

Awards and nominations 
He and Sidney Buchman won the Academy Award for Best Writing, Screenplay in 1941 for Here Comes Mr. Jordan.

He was also nominated with Fred Niblo, Jr. for their 1931 screen adaptation of Martin Flavin's play The Criminal Code.

Personal life
Miller married Bonita and had two children, Keith and Bonita, but he and his wife divorced in 1940. She demanded $2,000 a month in alimony claiming Miller abused her verbally and physically. He remarried in 1946, to actress Ann Evans and had another child, a daughter, Catherine, who became an actor.

Partial filmography 
As writer, unless otherwise specified.

 Paid to Love (1927)
 Two Girls Wanted (1927)
 The High School Hero (1927)
 Wolf Fangs (1927)
 A Girl in Every Port (1928)
 Fazil (1928)
 The Cowboy Kid (1928)
 Girl-Shy Cowboy (1928)
 The Air Circus (1928)
 The Far Call (1929)
 The Lone Star Ranger (1930)
Harmony at Home (1930)
 The Dawn Patrol (1930)
 Today (1930)
 The Criminal Code (1931)
 Scarface (1932)
 The Crowd Roars (1932)
 The Last Mile (1932)
 Once in a Lifetime (1932)
 Hot Saturday (1932)
 Murders in the Zoo (1933)
 Criminel (1933)
 The Eagle and the Hawk (1933)
 Gambling Ship (1933)
 Master of Men (1933)
 Come On, Marines! (1934)
 Murder in Trinidad (1934)
 Marie Galante (1934) (uncredited)
 A Perfect Weekend (1934)
 Charlie Chan's Courage (1934)
 The St. Louis Kid (1934)
 Murder on a Honeymoon (1935)
 G Men (1935)
 Frisco Kid (1935)
 It Happened in New York (1935)
 Two in the Dark (1936)
 The Marines Have Landed (1936)
 Bullets or Ballots (1936)
 Marked Woman (1937) (uncredited)
 San Quentin (1937) (uncredited)
 Back in Circulation (1937) (uncredited)
 The Great O'Malley (1937) (uncredited)
 Kid Galahad (1937)
 Penitentiary (1938)
 The Adventures of Robin Hood (1938)
 The Dawn Patrol (1938)
 Valley of the Giants (1938)
 Dust Be My Destiny (1939) (uncredited)
 Years Without Days a.k.a. Castle on the Hudson (1940)
 The Sea Hawk (1940)
 Here Comes Mr. Jordan (1941)
 This Woman Is Mine (1941)
 Secret Enemies (1942) (based on his story "Mr Farrell")
 My Gal Sal (1942)
 The Black Swan (1942)
 Trial by Trigger (1944) (short, uncredited)
 Ministry of Fear (1944) – also associate producer
 Two Years Before the Mast (1946) – also associate producer
 The Bride Wore Boots (1946) (producer only)
 California (1947) (uncredited, also produced)
 Calcutta (1947) (also produced)
 Singapore (1947)
 Fighter Squadron (1948) (also produced)
 Convicted (1950)
 The Man Who Cheated Himself (1950)
 Try and Get Me! (1950) – associate producer only
 Queen for a Day (1951) – also associate producer
 The Mississippi Gambler (1953)
 Bengal Brigade (1954)
 The Shanghai Story (1954)
 Istanbul (1957)
 The Last Mile (1959), a remake of the 1932 film
 Rogue for Hire (1960) (TV series) – creator, writer of pilot, producer
Death Valley Days (1963) – episode "Diamond Jim Brady"
 Knife for the Ladies (1974)
 Pete's Dragon (1977) (story)

References

External links
http://www.filmreference.com/Writers-and-Production-Artists-Me-Ni/Miller-Seton-I.html
 

1902 births
1974 deaths
American male screenwriters
Best Adapted Screenplay Academy Award winners
20th-century American male writers
20th-century American screenwriters